A regional election took place in Franche-Comté, France on 21 and 28 March 2004, along with all other regions. Raymond Forni (PS) was elected President, defeating incumbent Jean-François Humbert (UMP).

Election results

External links
 Minister of the Interior (France) 2004 official results

2004 elections in France
Politics of Franche-Comté